No. 143 Helicopter Unit (Dhanush) is a helicopter Unit and is equipped with HAL Prachand based at Jodhpur AFS.

History

143 Helicopter Unit, is the latest attack helicopter unit of the Indian Air Force. It is the first unit to be equipped with the indigenously developed HAL Prachand attack helicopter.
The unit was raised on 1 June 2022 and started receiving the initial lot of helicopters from 18 July, 2022. The unit officially inducted 4 HAL Prachand on 3 October, 2022.

Assignments

The unit will be tasked to carry out mainly ground attack missions. Prachand also has limited aerial combat capability. Armed with M621 cannon on Nexter THL-20 turret, ATAM, FZ275 LGR rockets and Dhruvastra anti-tank guided missiles, the helicopter is well versed in carrying out varied operations duties.

Aircraft

Gallery

References

143